Widdows is a surname. Notable people with the surname include:

 Christopher Widdows (born 1968), Australian comedian and actor with cerebral palsy, known under the stage name "Steady Eddy"
 Connor Widdows (born 1992), Canadian actor
 George H. Widdows (1871–1946), English architect
 Robin Widdows (born 1942), British former racing driver

See also
 Widdoes
 Widows